Aliaksandr Malashevich (born 7 April 1977) is a male discus thrower from Belarus. His personal best throw is 65.80 metres, achieved in June 2004 in Minsk.

He won the bronze medal at the 2001 Summer Universiade, finished sixth at the 2003 Summer Universiade and fifth at the 2005 Summer Universiade. He also competed at the 1999 World Championships and the 2004 Olympic Games without qualifying for the final round.

Competition record

References

1977 births
Living people
Belarusian male discus throwers
Athletes (track and field) at the 2004 Summer Olympics
Olympic athletes of Belarus
Universiade medalists in athletics (track and field)
Universiade bronze medalists for Belarus
Medalists at the 2001 Summer Universiade